The Train of Many Metals (also referred to as TOMM) is one of the New York Transit Museum's nostalgia trains used for excursions on the B Division. The name refers to most of the cars that were preserved being constructed from steel, and in reference to the Train of Many Colors.

The train made its first run in August 2014, when some of the cars were used on an excursion to The Rockaways as part of celebrating the restoration of service on the IND Rockaway Line. In general, cars may be used to commemorate a special occasion.

Some of the cars are housed in the New York Transit Museum when not used for excursions. Others are stored at the 207th Street Yard.

List of cars and colors

References

New York City Subway rolling stock